Carl Nyman may refer to:

 Carl Fredrik Nyman (1820–1893), Swedish botanist
 Carl R. Nyman (1895–1983), American businessman and politician